An Weijiang (also Weijiang An)  (born 27 August 1983) is a speed skater. He has participated in the 2006 Olympics for China.

Achievements
World Sprint Speed Skating Championships for Men (2 participations):
 2006, 2008
 Best result 11th in 2008

Personal records

References

External links
 DESG

1983 births
Living people
Chinese male speed skaters
Speed skaters at the 2006 Winter Olympics
Olympic speed skaters of China
Speed skaters at the 2007 Asian Winter Games